Kyzyl Yul (Qıźıl Yul) is a rural locality (a village) in Chebenlinsky Selsoviet, Alsheyevsky District, Bashkortostan, Russia. The population was 50 as of 2010. There are 2 streets.

Geography 
Kyzyl Yul is located 36 km south of Rayevsky (the district's administrative centre) by road. Kamenka is the nearest rural locality.

References 

Rural localities in Alsheyevsky District